Life of the Party: Stories of a Perpetual Man-Child is a 2014 memoir by Bert Kreischer, discussing how he came into his career.

Kirkus Reviews stated that the audience was probably majority male and seldom read books.

Reception
Publishers Weekly stated that the book is "a genuinely hilarious look at life in the fast lane" due to "Kreischer's "charm" due to his "affability and self-deprecation".

Kirkus Reviews stated that the book was "sophomoric".

References

2014 non-fiction books
American memoirs
St. Martin's Press books